Bybon was an athlete who lived in Ancient Greece during the early 6th century BC.

A single short inscription from Olympia records all that is known of Bybon. The son of a man named Phola, Bybon was apparently a weightlifter of remarkable capability.

The historian E. Norman Gardinier translates the word 'lifted' as 'threw'. In regard to the athletic culture in which such a throw may have been made he states: 

The stone is on display at the Archaeological Museum of Olympia.

See also
Ballistic training
Stone lifting
History of physical training and fitness

References

Year of birth unknown
Year of death unknown
Greek male weightlifters
Ancient Greek sportspeople
6th-century BC Greek people